Walls of Glass may refer to:

 Walls of Glass (album), 1983 album by Russ Taff
 Walls of Glass (film), 1985 American film

See also
 Wall of Glass